Mithileya Seetheyaru is a 1988 Indian Kannada-language film,  directed by K. S. L. Swamy (Lalitha Ravi) and produced by B. V. Radha. The film stars Geetha, Akhila Thandur, Kalpana Iyer and B. V. Radha. The film has musical score by Vijaya Bhaskar. The film marked the acting debut of Prakash Raj.

Cast

Geetha as Vanitha
Akhila Thandur
Kalpana Iyer
B. V. Radha as Pacho
H. G. Somashekar Rao as Viveshwaraiah
Vadiraj
L. S. Sudhindra
G. K. Govinda Rao
B. A. L. Prasanna
Srishailan
Gode Lakshminarayana
Srinivas Meshtru
Sridhar
Gopalakrishna
Jayaram
Nagabharana
Prakash Raj
Sringeri Ramanna
Gangadhar
Basavaraj
Rajanikumar
Venugopal
Jorge
Nagesh
Pandith
Gayathri Prabhakar
Sathyabhama
Kiran
Bhagavathi
Smt Srishailan
Baby Adithi
SPB as himself (Special Appearance)
Vishnuvardhan as S. K. Kumar (Special Appearance)
Kashinath as himself (Special Appearance)
Shankar Nag in Special Appearance

Soundtrack
The music was composed by Vijaya Bhaskar.

References

External links
 
 

1988 films
1980s Kannada-language films
Films scored by Vijaya Bhaskar
Films directed by K. S. L. Swamy